The Armide-class submarines were a class of three diesel-electric submarines built for the Greek and Japanese Navies before and during World War I. They were built in the Schneider-Creusot shipyards 1913 to 1918, but were seized during the war by the French government before they could be sold. The Armide class ships operated in the Mediterranean during the course of World War I and were stricken from the Navy list between 1928 and 1935.

Design
Propulsion while surfaced was provided by two  diesel motors built by the Swiss manufacturer Schneider-Carels and two  electric motors.

The ships were armed with 4 to 6 (depending on the ship)  torpedo tubes and 1 ×  L/50 M1902 Hotchkiss or  L/34 M1897 deck gun.  The crew of one ship consisted of 31 officers and seamen.

Ships 
Three Armide-class submarines were built in the Schneider-Creusot shipyards, France. Two ships were laid down in 1912 and the third in 1913,. The first submarine was launched in 1915 and the other two in 1916,. Armide was completed in 1916 and the others in 1917.

References

Citations 

 

World War I submarines of France
 
Ship classes of the French Navy